Frances Miriam "Berry" Whitcher (1811–1852) was an American humorist, born in Whitestown, New York.  Whitcher may have been the first significant woman prose humorist in the United States.

Family life

Frances was born November 1, 1811 in Whitestown, Oneida County, New York. She was the daughter of Lewis Berry.  She lived a fairly sheltered life, and was very close to her family.  She was often ill, but managed to find the ridiculous in everyday life. On January 6, 1847, at the age of 35, she married Rev. Benjamin Williams Whitcher, and in the Spring of that year moved with her new husband to Elmira, New York where he became the Rector of Trinity Church in April 1847. She had to put herself more into the public eye as a minister's wife. She died January 4, 1852 in Whitestown, New York.

Material
Whitcher's keen observations of those around her were an unending source of materials for her sketches.  Those she wrote about soon saw themselves in her prose, and this caused friction with her husband's parishioners.  This may have caused him to lose his position in the church.

Characters

She contributed poems to the Saturday Gazette and Godey's Lady's Book during the 1840s. Her humorous creation, The Widow Bedott, made her a celebrity. The characters she developed helped her satirize gentility, including issues such as fashion, social status, courtship, and hypocrisy. In 1855, The Widow Bedott Papers, was gathered from her writings and published in book form, featuring her chief character, the comic fool The Widow Bedott.

Afterwards, David R. Locke fashioned a coarsely amusing play from it. Consult the memoir by M. L. W. Whitcher in Frances M. Whitcher's Widow Spriggins (New York, 1867).

External links
 Frances Miriam Whicher's Widow Bedott story, 'The Widow Trades With A Peddler' is read in Mister Ron's Basement Podcast

1811 births
1852 deaths
American humorists
People from Whitestown, New York